Tomislav Brkić and Ante Pavić were the defending champions but chose not to defend their title.

Harri Heliövaara and Szymon Walków won the title after defeating Lloyd Glasspool and Alex Lawson 7–5, 6–3 in the final.

Seeds

Draw

References

External links
 Main draw

Thindown Challenger Biella - Doubles